is a 2014 Japanese mystery suspense film.

Cast
Atsushi Itō
Tōru Nakamura
Mirei Kiritani
Tori Matsuzaka 
Hidetoshi Nishijima
Ai Kato 
Chiaki Kuriyama

Reception
As of April 17, 2014, the film has grossed US$6,987,812 in Japan.

References

External links
 

2010s mystery films
Japanese mystery films
2010s Japanese films